After the conclusion of the 1698 English general election the government led by the Whig Junto believed it had held its ground against the opposition. Over the previous few years, divisions had emerged within the Whig party between the 'court' supporters of the junto and the 'country' faction, who disliked the royal prerogative, were concerned about governmental corruption, and opposed a standing army. Some contests were therefore between candidates representing 'court' and 'country', rather than Whig and Tory. The Whigs made gains in the counties and in small boroughs, but not in the larger urban constituencies.  After Parliament was dissolved on 7 July 1698, voting began on 19 July 1698 and continued until 10 August, with an order directing the new House of Commons to meet on 24 August 1698.

Increasingly, however, the Tories and the country Whigs managed to wear down the government's resolve and win over dissident Whig MPs. After 1699, the junto ministry gradually disintegrated to be replaced by a largely Tory government, which was securely in power by the autumn of 1700.

Party strengths are an approximation, with the allegiance of many MPs being unknown.

Summary of the constituencies

See 1796 British general election for details. The constituencies used in England and Wales were the same throughout the period. In 1707 alone the 45 Scottish members were not elected from the constituencies, but were returned by co-option of a part of the membership of the last Parliament of Scotland elected before the Union.

See also 
 4th Parliament of King William III
 List of parliaments of England

References

External links
 History of Parliament: Members 1690–1715
 History of Parliament: Constituencies 1690–1715

1701
General election
17th-century elections in Europe
1698 in politics